The Bad Batch may refer to:

Clone Force 99, a special clone trooper unit in the Star Wars universe
Star Wars: The Bad Batch, a 2021 animated television series based on this unit
Bad Batch, a 2010 film with JR Lemon
The Bad Batch (film), an 2016 dystopic thriller film